This is a list of Argentine billionaires based on an annual assessment of wealth and assets compiled and published by Forbes magazine in 2022.

2022 Argentine billionaires list

See also 

 The World's Billionaires
 List of countries by number of billionaires

References 

Lists of people by wealth
Net worth